U.S. Route 23 (US 23) is a United States Numbered Highway that runs from Jacksonville, Florida, to Mackinaw City, Michigan. In the state of Ohio, it is a major north–south state highway that runs from the Kentucky border at Portsmouth to the Michigan border at Sylvania.

Route description
The route crosses over the Ohio River via the U.S. Grant Bridge into the city of Portsmouth. Through downtown Portsmouth, it follows parallel one-way streets; northbound traffic is on Gay Street and southbound on Chillicothe Street. These roads merge into Scioto Trail, which becomes a divided highway north of Rosemount, and again north of Lucasville, through Piketon to just south of Waverly.

Within Waverly, the route runs concurrently with State Route 104 (SR 104), in addition to a four-block concurrency with SR 335 that ends in downtown Waverly. The concurrency with SR 104 ends just south of Chillicothe at which point US 23 becomes an expressway. The route bypasses Chillicothe to the east, including a short concurrency with US 35 before once again becoming a divided highway near Kingston. It continues as such through Circleville to the southern edge of Columbus, at the southern junction of Interstate 270 (I-270).

Columbus

In downtown Columbus, the route is applied to a one-way pair. It first jogs easterly via Livingston Avenue (north) and Fulton Street (south) before continuing northerly with northbound traffic on Fourth Street and southbound traffic on Third Street, which becomes Summit Street north of Fifth Avenue. The one-way pair ends at Hudson Street on the border of the SoHud and Glen Echo neighborhoods; both directions of US 23 jog westerly onto Hudson Street before continuing northerly on Indianola Avenue, closely paralleling I-71. The route then moves westerly again via Morse Road, then north again onto High Street on the north edge of the East Beechwold neighborhood. North of the northern junction with I-270, High Street becomes Columbus Pike.

The section immediately north of the northern junction with I-270 was upgraded with a northbound-only set of express lanes which passes under Dimension Drive, Campus View Boulevard, Radio City Boulevard, and Flint Road, with the former alignment of US 23 providing access to those roads. This configuration, known as the "Trench", opened to traffic in September 2015, and its construction coincides with a reconfiguration of the I-270 exit. After the Trench, US 23 leaves Columbus heading north.

North of Columbus
Heading north, US 23 becomes a four-lane road with a grass median, intersections at street level, and numerous public and private driveways. Starting at a short concurrency with US 42 south of Delaware, the route becomes a freeway through downtown Delaware, intersecting with US 36 and ending the concurrency with US 42. North of downtown Delaware, US 23 becomes a five-lane road, with a center lane dedicated for left-hand turns, from both directions. When it reaches the Delaware Dam and Delaware State Park south of Waldo, a grass median returns. From Waldo to southwest of Carey the route is an expressway, all intersections with numbered US and state routes are Interstate-style interchanges, while most county and local streets that intersect, are at street level and unsignaled. US 23 bypasses Waldo, Marion, and Upper Sandusky to the east. Southwest of Carey the route then departs the expressway passing through Carey, running concurrently with SR 103 while the expressway continues westerly as SR 15. Within Carey, the concurrency with SR 103 ends, and a concurrency with SR 199 begins. The two co-signed routes continue as a rural highway to Fostoria.

Within Fostoria, US 23 runs concurrently with SR 18 while turning westerly along Lytle Street, then northerly along the Midblock Underpass in concurrency with SR 12. At the northern end of the expressway, SR 12 departs while US 23, still concurrent with SR 18/SR 199, continues westerly along Tiffin Street, then northerly along County Line Street. SR 18/SR 199 departs within Fostoria city limits, while US 23 continues northerly and becomes Fostoria Road. Northeast of Bradner, the route has a junction with US 6.

Northwest of Woodville, the route runs concurrently with US 20; the highway continues northwesterly to Perrysburg. There, US 23 begins a brief wrong-way concurrency with I-75, then departs for a concurrency with I-475, the western bypass of the Toledo metropolitan area. US 23 and I-475 run concurrently for the latter route's entire north–south portion, until I-475 departs in Sylvania to become an east–west aligned route. US 23 then continues northerly into Michigan as a freeway.

History
Before the establishment of the United States Numbered Highway System in 1926, the route of what would eventually become US 23 was numbered as SR 4 from Portsmouth to Marion; SR 22 from Marion to Carey; SR 63 from Carey to Fostoria; SR 199 from Fostoria to Millbury; and SR 2 from Millbury to Toledo. Over the years, portions of US 23 have been realigned to divided highway, freeway, or expressway portions. Among these are a bypass of Circleville built in 1958; the Marion–Carey expressway routing, on which work began in 1962; and a bypass of Chillicothe, on which work began in 1966.

When first established, US 23 followed its current routing from Fostoria to Woodville, then continued north along present-day Fostoria Road into Millbury and northwest along present-day SR 51 (Woodville Road) into East Toledo. There, it followed East Broadway Avenue, Starr Avenue, and Main Street to the Cherry Street Bridge (now the Martin Luther King Bridge) across the Maumee River. The route then followed Cherry Street (present-day SR 120) to Detroit Avenue (US 24), before turning west onto Laskey Road and north onto Lewis Avenue. Only a year later, the Fostoria–Toledo routing was shifted westerly, taking a northwest–southeast route that was originally designated SR 63 between Fostoria and Perrysburg, then East River Road into Toledo. It crossed the Maumee River via the Fassett Street Bridge, then followed South, Sumner, Logan, Summit, and Huron streets to rejoin its original routing. The Fostoria–Millbury routing was designated SR 199, and the Millbury–Toledo routing became SR 102, which in turn became present-day SR 51 in 1955. By 1940, US 23 was shifted westerly again in Toledo, taking the Anthony Wayne Bridge to Summit Street, then to Jefferson Avenue and Collingwood Boulevard before rejoining the previous routing.

US 23 was realigned  to follow Monroe Street northwesterly out of Toledo, joining with the first constructed segment of its current freeway routing in Sylvania. The freeway was extended southerly to US 20 (Central Avenue) by 1964. By 1969, the entire western freeway bypass of Toledo was complete, carrying the current routings of both US 23 and I-475. In addition, US 23 and SR 199 were swapped north of Fostoria in 1969, as US 23 reverted to its pre-1927 routing between Fostoria and Woodville, then running concurrently with US 20 from there to Perrysburg. The 1927–1969 routing of US 23 between Fostoria and Perrysburg thus became part of SR 199.

A plan was proposed by the Ohio Department of Transportation (ODOT) in July 2020 to improve safety along US 23 in Wyandot County by reconfiguring several intersections and closing others to eliminate cross traffic and turns across opposing traffic for the stretch of US 23 between the interchange at SR 231 in Marion County and the interchange at SR 199 south of Upper Sandusky. After public comments, the proposal was revised to drop one intersection from the plan over concerns about the impact on emergency services. The rest of the plan was rejected by the Wyandot County Commission in May 2021 because of the impacts on the community and the community's preference for an interchange at SR 294.

Future
North of Upper Sandusky in Salem Township, Wyandot County, there have been a number of serious crashes at the intersection with County Road 44 and Township Road 44 from 2016 to 2021. To improve its safety, beginning April 11, 2022, ODOT will convert the intersection to a pair of RIROs and close the median crossover. Once this conversion is completed, the stretch of US 23 from SR 199 south of Sandusky, through this junction, will be free of cross traffic and turns across opposing traffic.

Major intersections

References

External links

23
 
Transportation in Scioto County, Ohio
Transportation in Pike County, Ohio
Transportation in Ross County, Ohio
Transportation in Pickaway County, Ohio
Transportation in Franklin County, Ohio
Transportation in Delaware County, Ohio
Transportation in Marion County, Ohio
Transportation in Wyandot County, Ohio
Transportation in Seneca County, Ohio
Transportation in Sandusky County, Ohio
Transportation in Wood County, Ohio
Transportation in Lucas County, Ohio